Satyanarayan Patel is an Indian politician and national secretary of the Indian National Congress party.

Political career 
In February 2014, Satyanarayan Patel won the internal party election process also known as primaries to select the Congress candidate for the Indore Lok Sabha constituency. He was the first candidate to win such election. However, he later lost the Lok Sabha election to BJP candidate Sumitra Mahajan.

He has shouldered various responsibilities within party and in government:

Fake allegation 
In October 2013, just before assembly election in Madhya Pradesh, a sleaze CD surfaced featuring Satyanarayan Patel. However, the matter was immediately reported to the concerned authorities and the authenticity of the video was investigated by forensic lab in New Delhi. The report stated that the video was fake. Subsequently, three people were arrested by the police under cyber law for morphing.

See also
Madhya Pradesh Legislative Assembly
2008 Madhya Pradesh Legislative Assembly election
1998 Madhya Pradesh Legislative Assembly election

References

External links

Living people
Madhya Pradesh MLAs 1998–2003
Politicians from Indore
Indian National Congress politicians from Madhya Pradesh
1967 births